Gabriel Fernando Atz (born 4 August 1981) is a Brazilian former footballer.

Career
Gabriel played for Grêmio de Porto Alegre since he was 14 years old and reached the seniors in 1999 when he was 17 years old. He stayed at Grêmio until January 2002 and in June 2002 he moved to União de Leiria in Portugal where he played for 4 seasons.
In June 2006, Gabriel Atz joined FC Rubin Kazan on a three-year contract. On 29 August 2008, Gabriel joined FC Khimki on loan until the end of the season.
In 2009, Gabriel Atz joined Gimnàstic de Tarragona and played for them on loan from FC Rubin Kazan until the end of the Spanish Segunda season. Gimnàstic, however, decided against executing the purchase option after his loan finished.

In 2010, the Bulgarian PFC Chernomorets Burgas signed the defender from Rubin Kazan for an undisclosed fee. On 13 April 2010 he made his debut in a 2–0 A PFG win against OFC Sliven 2000. He made 2 appearances and scored once, but soon after he picked up an injury and was sidelined for one year. After a serious muscle injury in the rectus femoris that took him out of competitions for almost 2 years, he returned to Brazil to play in 2012 for S.E.R. Caxias do Brasil. Then in 2013 he played for Pelotas, 2014 for Lajeadense, 2015 for Brasil de Farroupilha and ended his career for Lajeadense in 2016.
In 2017 he started his career as a coach and game analyst at Lajeadense and Cruzeiro.
In July 2017 he returned to Portugal to play for Estarreja and complete the football coach training courses.
After playing 1 year in Estarreja, he spent 2 more years as Assistant Coach, in the 2018/19 and 2019/20 seasons. Then he stayed for 6 months in the formation of Sport Club Beira Mar as assistant coach of the Under 19, and went to the Seniors of Sporting Clube São João de Ver, where he gained access to Liga 3 as assistant coach in the 2020/21 season. In 2021 he completed his Degree in Sports Science at the Faculty of Porto, and today he holds the UEFA B diploma by the Aveiro Football Association.

References

External links
 CBF
 Portuguese Liga 2005–06
 Profile at Rubin
 ZeroZero profile

1981 births
Sportspeople from Rio Grande do Sul
Brazilian people of German descent
Living people
Brazilian footballers
Association football defenders
Grêmio Foot-Ball Porto Alegrense players
U.D. Leiria players
FC Rubin Kazan players
FC Khimki players
Gimnàstic de Tarragona footballers
PFC Chernomorets Burgas players
Sociedade Esportiva e Recreativa Caxias do Sul players
Esporte Clube Pelotas players
Clube Esportivo Lajeadense players
Sociedade Esportiva Recreativa e Cultural Brasil players
Primeira Liga players
Russian Premier League players
Segunda División players
First Professional Football League (Bulgaria) players
Campeonato Brasileiro Série D players
Brazilian expatriate footballers
Expatriate footballers in Portugal
Brazilian expatriate sportspeople in Portugal
Expatriate footballers in Russia
Brazilian expatriate sportspeople in Russia
Expatriate footballers in Spain
Brazilian expatriate sportspeople in Spain
Expatriate footballers in Bulgaria
Brazilian expatriate sportspeople in Bulgaria